List of Guggenheim Fellowships awarded in 1984

References

See also
Guggenheim Fellowship

1984
1984 awards